The 29th Annual TV Week Logie Awards was held on Friday 3 April 1987 at the Hyatt on Collins in Melbourne, and broadcast on Network Ten. The ceremony was hosted by Don Lane and guests included Lee Majors, Brian Dennehy, Loretta Swit, Harry Hamlin, Laura Johnson, Leeza Gibbons, Dame Edna Everage and Nicole Kidman.

National Awards

Gold Logie
Most Popular Personality on Australian Television
Winner:
Ray Martin in Midday (Nine Network)

Acting

Most Popular Actor
Winner:
Peter O'Brien in Neighbours (Network Ten)

Most Popular Actress
Winner:
Kylie Minogue in Neighbours (Network Ten)

Most Popular Actor in a Miniseries or Telemovie
Winner:
Andrew Clarke in Sword of Honour (Seven Network)

Most Popular Actress in a Miniseries or Telemovie
Winner:
Tracy Mann in Sword of Honour (Seven Network)

Most Popular New Talent
Winner:
Jason Donovan in Neighbours (Network Ten)

Most Popular Programs/Videos

Most Popular Drama Series
Winner:
Neighbours (Network Ten)

Most Popular Miniseries or Telemovie
Winner:
Sword of Honour (Seven Network)

Most Popular Light Entertainment Program
Winner:
Hey Hey It's Saturday (Nine Network)

Most Popular Public Affairs Program
Winner:
60 Minutes (Nine Network)

Most Popular Sports Coverage
Winner:
Wide World of Sports (Nine Network)

Most Popular Children's Program
Winner:
Wombat (Seven Network)

Most Popular Music Video
Winner:
"You're the Voice" by John Farnham

Most Outstanding Programs

Most Outstanding Single Documentary or Documentary Series
Winners:
Handle with Care (Network Ten) and The Greatest Gift (Nine Network) – Tied

Most Outstanding Achievement in News
Winner:
"Russell Street Bombing" (Network Ten)

Most Outstanding Achievement in Public Affairs
Winner:
"Coup D'Etat", ABC News (ABC)

Most Outstanding Achievement by a Regional Television
Winner:
Kids Only (BTV-6, Ballarat)

State Awards

New South Wales
Most Popular Personality
Winner:
Ray Martin (Nine Network)

Most Popular Program
Winner:
A Country Practice (Seven Network)

Queensland
Most Popular Personality
Winner:
Jacki MacDonald (Nine Network)

Most Popular Program
Winner:
State Affair (Seven Network)

South Australia
Most Popular Personality
Winner:
Anne Wills (Network Ten)

Most Popular Program
Winner:
State Affair (Seven Network)

Tasmania
Most Popular Personality
Winner:
Tom Payne (TVT-6)

Most Popular Program
Winner:
Midweek (TVT-6)

Victoria
Most Popular Personality
Winner:
Daryl Somers (Nine Network)

Most Popular Program
Winner:
Neighbours (Network Ten)

Western Australia
Most Popular Personality
Winner:
Rick Ardon (Seven Network)

Most Popular Program
Winner:
State Affair (Seven Network)

Performers
Don Lane
Daryl Somers
Kerri-Anne Kennerley
Michael Cormack and the Jillian Fitzgerald dancers
Dame Edna Everage and dancers

Hall of Fame
After a lifetime in the Australian television industry, Paul Hogan became the fourth inductee into the TV Week Logies Hall of Fame.

References

External links
 

1987 in Australian television
1987 television awards
1987